KPTT Agricultural Training Center (Kursus Pertanian Taman Tani) is a Jesuit-run boarding and day school that teaches organic farming. It was founded in 1965 in Salatiga, Central Java, Indonesia.

See also
 List of Jesuit sites

References   

Jesuit development centres
Education in Indonesia
Educational institutions established in 1965
Environmental organizations based in Indonesia
Rural development
Poverty-related organizations
Community-building organizations
Social welfare charities
Development studies
Research institutes in Indonesia
1965 establishments in Indonesia